Kim de Weille (born April 1976) is a Dutch former professional tennis player.

Biography

Tennis career
A right-handed player, de Weille had a best singles ranking of 116 in the world and won six singles titles on the ITF Women's Circuit. This included an $25k event in Prostějov in 1994 where she beat an up and coming Martina Hingis in the semifinals.

Her best performance on the WTA Tour came at the 1995 Amway Classic in Auckland, making it through to the quarterfinals, with wins over Bettina Fulco-Villella and top 50 player Linda Harvey-Wild.

She featured in the singles qualifying draws of all four grand slam tournaments during her career and reached the final round of qualifying at the 1995 US Open. As a doubles player she played in the main draw of the 1996 Australian Open, with Seda Noorlander.

Personal life
De Weille has two children with husband Menco and lives in Leimuiden.

ITF finals

Singles (6–4)

Doubles (4–7)

References

External links
 
 

1976 births
Living people
Dutch female tennis players
People from Uithoorn
Sportspeople from North Holland
20th-century Dutch women
21st-century Dutch women